Clarence County is one of the 141 Cadastral divisions of New South Wales. It lies to the north of the Orara River, and includes the mouth of the Clarence River, and the city of Grafton.

Clarence County is named in honour of the Duke of Clarence – William IV (1765-1837).

Parishes within this county
A full list of parishes found within this county; their current LGA and mapping coordinates to the approximate centre of each location is as follows:

References

Counties of New South Wales
Northern Rivers